Minuscule 2754 (in the Gregory-Aland numbering) is a Greek minuscule manuscript of the New Testament, on 256 parchment leaves (19.3 cm by 14.3 cm). It has been dated paleographically to the 11th century.

Description  
The codex contains the text of the four Gospels with some lacunae. The text is written in one column per page, with 25 to 26 lines per page.

Kurt Aland did not place it in any Category.
It was not examined by the Claremont Profile Method.

The codex now is housed at Bible Museum Münster (Ms. 8).

See also 
 List of New Testament minuscules
 Textual criticism
 Bible Museum Münster

References

External links 

 Manuscripts of the Bible Museum 
 Images of manuscript 2754 at the CSNTM 

Greek New Testament minuscules
11th-century biblical manuscripts